Prostanthera hirtula, commonly known as hairy mintbush, is a species of flowering plant in the family Lamiaceae and is endemic to the south-eastern continental Australia. It is a strongly aromatic, densely hairy, spreading shrub with narrow egg-shaped leaves and dark mauve flowers, and that grows in exposed, rocky sites.

Description
Flowering occurs in spring.

Taxonomy and naming
Prostanthera hirtula was first formally described in 1870 by George Bentham from an unpublished description by Ferdinand von Mueller, based on specimens collected at Mount Buffalo and Mount Disappointment by Mueller and in the Grampians by Carl Wilhelmi. Bentham's description was published in Flora Australiensis.

Distribution and habitat
Hairy mintbush grows on elevated, rocky sites in woodland and open forest in New South Wales from the Blue Mountains to the Budawang Range and in southern Victoria.

References

hirtula
Flora of New South Wales
Flora of Victoria (Australia)
Lamiales of Australia
Taxa named by George Bentham
Taxa named by Ferdinand von Mueller
Plants described in 1870